This is a list of Swedish television related events from 1959.

Events
29 January - Siw Malmkvist is selected to represent Sweden at the 1959 Eurovision Song Contest with her song "Augustin". She is selected to be the second Swedish Eurovision entry during Melodifestivalen held at Cirkus in Stockholm.

Debuts

Television shows

Ending this year

Births

Deaths

See also
1959 in Sweden